Khanozai Khushab is a village in Pishin District, tehsil Karezat.

Populated places in Pishin District